The Virginia class, also known as the SSN-774 class, is a class of nuclear-powered cruise missile fast-attack submarines, in service in the United States Navy. Designed by General Dynamics Electric Boat (EB) and Huntington Ingalls Industries, the Virginia class is the United States Navy's latest submarine model, which incorporates the latest in stealth, intelligence gathering, and weapons systems technology.

Virginia-class submarines are designed for a broad spectrum of open-ocean and littoral missions, including anti-submarine warfare and intelligence gathering operations. They are scheduled to replace older s, many of which have already been decommissioned. Virginia-class submarines will be acquired through 2043, and are expected to remain in service until at least 2060, with later submarines expected to remain into the 2070s.

In March 2023, AUKUS announced that the Royal Australian Navy would purchase three Virginia-class submarines as a stopgap measure between the retirement of their conventionally powered s and the acquisition of the future SSN-AUKUS class submarines, and if the SSN-AUKUS build schedule falls behind, has an option of purchasing two additional Virginia-class submarines.

History 

The class was developed under the codename Centurion, later renamed New SSN (NSSN). The "Centurion Study" was initiated in February 1991. The Virginia-class submarine was the first US Navy warship with its development coordinated using such 3D visualization technology as CATIA, which comprises computer-aided engineering (CAE), design (CAD), manufacturing (CAM), and product lifecycle management (PLM). Design problems for Electric Boat—and maintenance problems for the Navy—ensued nonetheless.

By 2007 approximately 35 million labor hours had been spent to design the Virginia class. Constructing a single Virginia-class submarine has required around nine million labor hours, and over 4,000 suppliers. Each submarine is projected to make 14–15 deployments during its 33-year service life.

To reduce costs, the Virginia-class submarines use many "commercial off-the-shelf" (COTS) components, especially in their computers and data networks. Improvements in shipbuilding technology have trimmed production costs below the $1.8 billion projected fiscal year 2009 dollars.

In hearings before both House of Representatives and Senate committees, the Congressional Research Service (CRS) and expert witnesses testified that the annual procurement rate of only one Virginia-class boat—rising to two in 2012—would result in excessive unit production costs, yet an insufficient complement of attack submarines. In a 10 March 2005 statement to the House Armed Services Committee, Ronald O'Rourke of the CRS testified that, assuming that the production rate remains as planned, "production economies of scale for submarines would continue to remain limited or poor."

In 2001, Newport News Shipbuilding and the General Dynamics Electric Boat Company built a quarter-scale version of a Virginia-class submarine dubbed Large Scale Vehicle II (LSV II) Cutthroat. The vehicle was designed as an affordable test platform for new technologies.

The Virginia class is built through an industrial arrangement designed to maintain both GD Electric Boat and Newport News Shipbuilding, the only two U.S. shipyards capable of building nuclear-powered submarines. Under the present arrangement, the Newport News facility builds the stern, habitability, machinery spaces, torpedo room, sail, and bow, while Electric Boat builds the engine room and control room. The facilities alternate work on the reactor plant as well as the final assembly, test, outfit, and delivery.

O'Rourke wrote in 2004 that, "Compared to a one-yard strategy, approaches involving two yards may be more expensive but offer potential offsetting benefits." Among the claims of "offsetting benefits" that O'Rourke attributes to supporters of a two-facility construction arrangement is that it "would permit the United States to continue building submarines at one yard even if the other yard is rendered incapable of building submarines permanently or for a sustained period of time by a catastrophic event of some kind", including an enemy attack.

In order to get the submarine's price down to $2 billion per submarine in FY-05 dollars, the Navy instituted a cost-reduction program to shave off approximately $400 million of each submarine's price tag. The project was dubbed "2 for 4 in 12," referring to the Navy's desire to buy two boats for $4 billion in FY-12. Under pressure from Congress, the Navy opted to start buying two boats per year in FY-11, meaning that officials would not be able to get the $2 billion price tag before the service started buying two submarines per year. However, program manager Dave Johnson said at a conference on 19 March 2008 that the program was only $30 million away from achieving the $2 billion price goal, and would reach that target on schedule.

The Virginia-class Program Office received the David Packard Excellence in Acquisition Award in 1996, 1998, 2008, "for excelling in four specific award criteria: reducing life-cycle costs; making the acquisition system more efficient, responsive, and timely; integrating defense with the commercial base and practices; and promoting continuous improvement of the acquisition process".

In December 2008, the Navy signed a $14 billion contract with General Dynamics and Northrop Grumman to supply eight submarines. The contract required the delivery of one submarine in each of fiscal 2009 and 2010, and two submarines on each of fiscal 2011, 2012, and 2013. This contract was designed to bring the Navy's Virginia-class fleet to 18 submarines. In December 2010, the United States Congress passed a defense authorization bill that expanded production to two subs per year. Two submarine-per-year production resumed on 2 September 2011 with commencement of  construction.

On 21 June 2008, the Navy christened , the first Block II submarine. This boat was delivered eight months ahead of schedule and $54 million under budget. Block II boats are built in four sections, compared to the ten sections of the Block I boats. This enables a cost saving of about $300 million per boat, reducing the overall cost to $2 billion per boat and the construction of two new boats per year. Beginning in 2010, new submarines of this class were to have included a software system that can monitor and reduce their electromagnetic signatures when needed.

The first full-duration six-month deployment was successfully carried out from 15 October 2009 to 13 April 2010. Authorization of full-rate production and the declaration of full operational capability was achieved five months later. In September 2010, it was found that urethane tiles, applied to the hull to damp internal sound and absorb rather than reflect sonar pulses, were falling off while the subs were at sea. Admiral Kevin McCoy announced that the problems with the Mold-in-Place Special Hull Treatment for the early subs had been fixed in 2011, then Minnesota was built and found to have the same problem.

In 2013, just as two-per-year sub construction was supposed to commence, Congress failed to resolve the United States fiscal cliff, forcing the Navy to attempt to "de-obligate" construction funds.

In April 2019, the Congressional Research Service (CRS) reported that the Navy estimated the cost of a boat was $2.8 billion. In September 2021, the CRS reported that the Navy estimates at the present production rate of two boats per a year that the cost per a boat when equipped with the additional Virginia Payload Module (VPM) mid-body section was $3.45 billion.

Innovations 

The Virginia class incorporates several innovations not found in previous US submarine classes.

Technology barriers 
Because of the low rate of Virginia production, the Navy entered into a program with DARPA to overcome technology barriers to lower the cost of attack submarines so that more could be built, to maintain the size of the fleet.

These include:
 Propulsion concepts not constrained by a centerline shaft.
 Externally stowed and launched weapons (especially torpedoes).
 Conformal alternatives to the existing spherical sonar array.
 Technologies that eliminate or substantially simplify existing submarine hull, mechanical, and electrical systems.
 Automation to reduce crew workload for standard tasks

Unified Modular Masts 
Virginia-class subs are the first class where all masts share common design - the Universal Modular Mast (UMM) - designed by L3 KEO (previously Kollmorgen). Shared components have been maximized and some design choices are also shared between different masts. The UMM is an integrated system for housing, erecting, and supporting submarine mast-mounted antennas and sensors. The UMMs are the following:
 Snorkel mast
 Two photonic masts
 Two communication masts
 One or two high-data-rate satellite communication (SATCOM) masts, built by Raytheon, enabling communication at Super High Frequency (for downlink) and Extremely High Frequency (for uplink) range
 Radar mast (carrying AN/BPS-16 surface search and navigation radar)
 Electronic warfare mast (AN/BLQ-10 Electronic Support Measures) used to detect, analyze, and identify both radar and communication signals from ships, aircraft, submarines, and land-based transmitters

Photonics masts
The Virginia class is the first to utilize photonic sensors instead of a traditional periscope. The class is equipped with high-resolution cameras, along with light-intensification and infrared sensors, an infrared laser rangefinder, and an integrated Electronic Support Measures (ESM) array. Two redundant sets of these sensors are mounted on two AN/BVS-1 photonics masts located outside the pressure hull. Signals from the masts' sensors are transmitted through optical fiber data lines through signal processors to the control center. Visual feeds from the masts are displayed on liquid-crystal display interfaces in the command center.

The design of earlier optical periscopes required them to penetrate the pressure hull, reducing the structural integrity of the pressure hull as well as increasing the risk of flooding, and also required the submarine's control room to be located directly below the sail/fin. Implementation of photonics masts (which do not penetrate the pressure hull) enabled the submarine control room to be relocated to a position inside the pressure hull which is not necessarily directly below the sail.

The current photonics masts have a visual appearance so different from ordinary periscopes that when the submarine is detected, it can be distinctly identified as a Virginia-class vessel. As a result, current photonic masts will be replaced with Low-Profile Photonics Masts (LPPM) which resemble traditional submarine periscopes more closely.

In the future, a non-rotational Affordable Modular Panoramic Photonics Mast may be fitted, enabling the submarine to obtain a simultaneous 360° view of the sea surface.

Propulsor 
In contrast to a traditional bladed propeller, the Virginia class uses pump-jet propulsors by BAE Systems, originally developed for the Royal Navy's s. The propulsor significantly reduces the risks of cavitation, and allows quieter operation.

Improved sonar systems 
Sonar arrays aboard Virginia-class submarines have an "Open System Architecture" (OSA) which enables rapid insertion of new hardware and software as they become available. Hardware upgrades (dubbed Technology Insertions) are usually carried out every four years, while software updates (dubbed Advanced Processor Builds) are carried out every two years. Virginia-class submarines feature several types of sonar arrays.
 BQQ-10 bow-mounted spherical active/passive sonar array (Large Aperture Bow (LAB) sonar array from SSN-784 onward)
 A wide aperture lightweight fiber optic sonar array, consisting of three flat panels mounted low along either side of the hull
 Two high frequency active sonars mounted in the sail and bow. The chin-mounted (below the bow) and sail-mounted high frequency sonars supplement the (spherical/LAB) main sonar array, enabling safer operations in coastal waters, enhancing under-ice navigation, and improving anti-submarine warfare performance.
 Low-Cost Conformal Array (LCCA) high frequency sonar, mounted on both sides of the submarine's sail. Provides coverage above and behind the submarine.

Virginia-class submarines are also equipped with a low frequency towed sonar array and a high frequency towed sonar array.
 TB-16 or TB-34 fat line tactical towed sonar array
 TB-29 or TB-33 thin line long-range search towed sonar array

Rescue equipment 
 Submarine Escape Immersion Equipment MK11 suit(s) that enable ascent from a sunken submarine (maximum ascent depth )
 Lithium hydroxide canisters that remove carbon dioxide from the submarine's atmosphere
 Submarine Emergency Position Indicating Radio Beacon (SEPIRB)

Virginia Payload Module 

The Block III submarines have two multipurpose Virginia Payload Tubes (VPT) replacing the dozen single purpose cruise missile launch tubes.

The Block V submarines built from 2019 onward will have an additional Virginia Payload Module (VPM) mid-body section, increasing their overall length. The VPM will add four more VPTs of the same diameter and greater height, located on the centerline, carrying up to seven Tomahawk missiles apiece, that would replace some of the capabilities lost when the SSGN conversion s are retired from the fleet.

The VPM could potentially carry (non-nuclear) medium-range ballistic missiles. Adding the VPM would increase the cost of each submarine by $500 million (2012 prices). This additional cost would be offset by reducing the total submarine force by four boats. More recent reports state that as a cost reduction measure the VPM would carry only Tomahawk SLCM and possibly unmanned undersea vehicles (UUV) with the new price tag now estimated at $360–380 million per boat (in 2010 prices). The VPM launch tubes/silos will reportedly be similar in design to the ones planned for the Ohio-class replacement. In July 2016 General Dynamics was awarded $19 million for VPM development. In February 2017 General Dynamics was awarded $126 million for long lead time construction of Block V submarines equipped with VPM.

The VPM was designed by BWX Technologies (the same company also designs the missile tubes for the ), however, manufacture is undertaken by BAE Systems.

High-energy laser weapon
According to open-source budget documents, Virginia-class submarines are planned to be equipped with a high-energy laser weapon likely to be incorporated into the photonics mast and have a power output of 300–500 kilowatts, based on the submarine's 210 megawatts reactor capacity.

Other improved equipment 

 Optical fiber fly-by-wire Ship Control System replaces electro-hydraulic systems for control surface actuation.
 Command and control system module (CCSM) built by Lockheed Martin.
 The auxiliary generator is powered by a Caterpillar model 3512B V-12 marine diesel engine. This replaced the Fairbanks-Morse diesel engine, which would not fit in Virginias auxiliary machinery room.
 Modernized version of the AN/BSY-1 integrated combat system designated AN/BYG-1 (previously designated CCS Mk2) and built by General Dynamics AIS (previously Raytheon). AN/BYG-1 integrates the submarine Tactical Control System (TCS) and Weapon Control System (WCS).
 USS California was the first Virginia-class submarine with the advanced electromagnetic signature reduction system built into it, but this system is being retrofitted into the other submarines of the class.
 Integral 9-man lock-out diving chamber.

Specifications 

 Builders: General Dynamics Electric Boat and HII Newport News Shipbuilding
 Length:  [Block V: 460 ft (140.2 m)]
 Beam: 
 Displacement:  [Block V: 
 Payload: 40 weapons, special operations forces, unmanned undersea vehicles, Advanced SEAL Delivery System (ASDS) [Block V: 40 Tomahawk cruise missiles]
 Propulsion: S9G nuclear reactor delivering . Nuclear core life estimated at 33 years. Nuclear fuel manufactured by BWX Technologies.
 Planned cost: about US$1.65 billion each (based on FY95 dollars, 30-boat class and two boat/year build-rate)
 Actual cost: US$1.5 billion (in 1994 prices), US$2.6 billion (in 2012 prices)
 Annual operating cost: $50 million per unit (in 2012 prices)
 Crew: 120 enlisted and 14 officers
 Armament: 12 VLS & four torpedo tubes, capable of launching Mark 48 torpedoes, UGM-109 Tactical Tomahawks, Harpoon missiles and the new advanced mobile mine when it becomes available. Block V boats will have the additional VPM module which contains four large diameter tubes which can accommodate seven Tomahawk cruise missiles each. This would increase the total number of torpedo-sized weapons (such as Tomahawks) carried by the Virginia-class design from about 37 to about 65—an increase of about 76%.
 Decoys: Acoustic Device Countermeasure Mk 3/4

Blocks

Block I 

Block I involved 4 boats and modular construction techniques were incorporated during construction. Earlier submarines (e.g., Los Angeles-class SSNs) were built by assembling the pressure hull and then installing the equipment via cavities in the pressure hull. This required extensive construction activities within the narrow confines of the pressure hull which was time-consuming and dangerous. Modular construction was implemented in an effort to overcome these problems and make the construction process more efficient. Modular construction techniques incorporated during construction include constructing large segments of equipment outside the hull. These segments (dubbed rafts) are then inserted into a hull section (a large segment of the pressure hull). The integrated raft and hull section form a module which, when joined with other modules, forms a Virginia-class submarine. Block I boats were built in 10 modules with each submarine requiring roughly 7 years (84 months) to build.

Block II 

Block II involved 6 boats; they were built in four sections rather than ten sections, saving about $300 million per boat. Block II boats (excluding SSN-778) were also built under a multi-year procurement agreement as opposed to a block-buy contract in Block I, enabling savings in the range of $400 million ($80 million per boat). As a result of improvements in the construction process, New Hampshire was US$500 million cheaper, required 3.7 million fewer labor hours to build (25% less), thus shortening the construction period by 15 months (20% less) compared to Virginia.

Block III 

 through SSN-791 (8 boats) make up the Third Block or "Flight" and began construction in 2009. Block III subs feature a revised bow with a Large Aperture Bow (LAB) sonar array, as well as technology from Ohio-class SSGNs (2 VLS tubes each containing 6 missiles). The horseshoe-shaped LAB sonar array replaces the spherical main sonar array which has been used on all U.S. Navy SSNs since 1960. The LAB sonar array is water-backed—as opposed to earlier sonar arrays which were air-backed—and consists of a passive array and a medium-frequency active array. Compared to earlier Virginia-class submarines about 40% of the bow has been redesigned.

South Dakota (SSN-790) will be equipped with a new propulsor, possibly the Hybrid Multi-Material Rotor (HMMR), developed by Defense Advanced Research Projects Agency (DARPA). The Hybrid Multi-Material Rotor program is an attempt to improve the design and manufacturing process of submarine propellers with an aim of reducing the cost and weight of the propeller/rotor as well as improving overall acoustic performance.

Block IV 

Block IV involved 10 boats. In 2013, execution of this 10-submarine contract was put in doubt by budget sequestration in 2013. The most costly shipbuilding contract in history was awarded on 28 April 2014 as prime contractor General Dynamics Electric Boat took on a $17.6 billion contract for ten Block IV Virginia-class attack submarines. The main improvement over the Block III is the reduction of major maintenance periods from four to three, increasing each boat's total lifetime deployments by one.

The long-lead-time materials contract for SSN-792 was awarded on 17 April 2012, with SSN-793 and SSN-794 following on 28 December 2012. The U.S. Navy has awarded General Dynamics Electric Boat a $208.6 million contract modification for the second fiscal year (FY) 14 Virginia-class submarine, SSN-793, and two FY 15 submarines, SSN-794 and SSN-795. With this modification, the overall contract is worth $595 million. Block IV consists of 10 submarines.

Block V
Block V involves 10 boats and may incorporate the Virginia Payload Module (VPM), which would give guided-missile capability when the SSGNs are retired from service. The Virginia Payload Module will be included on Block V submarines starting with the second boat, SSN-803. The Block V boats with VPM are expected to triple the capacity of shore targets for each boat. Construction on the first two boats of this block was expected to begin in 2019 but was pushed back to 2020, with contracts for long lead time material for SSN-802 and SSN-803 being awarded to General Dynamic's Electric Boat. HII Newport News Shipbuilding was awarded a long-lead materials contract for two Block V boats in 2017, the first Block Vs for the company.

On 2 December 2019, the Navy announced an order for nine new Virginia-class submarines—eight Block Vs and one Block IV—for a total contract price of $22 billion with an option for a tenth boat. The Block V subs were confirmed to have an increased length, from 377 ft (115 m) to 460 ft (140 m), and displacement, from 7,800 tons to 10,200 tons. This would make the Block V the second-largest US submarine, behind only the Ohio class (at 560 ft; 170 m).

On 22 March 2021, the U.S. Navy added a 10th ship in Block V series of the Virginia-class attack submarine, issuing a $2.4 billion adjustment on the December 2019 contract. This brings the total cost of the contract with prime contractor General Dynamics Electric Boat to $24.1 billion. The net increase for the contract is $1.89 billion, according to a General Dynamics release. Huntington Ingalls Industries' Newport News shipyard is the partner yard in the program.

Boats in class

Future acquisitions 
The Navy plans to acquire at least 34 Virginia-class submarines, however, more recent data provided by the Naval Submarine League (in 2011) and the Congressional Budget Office (in 2012) seems to imply that more than 30 submarines may eventually be built. The Naval Submarine League believes that up to 10 Block V boats will be built. The same source also states that 10 additional submarines could be built after Block V submarines, with 5 in the so-called Block VI and 5 in Block VII, largely due to the delays experienced with the "Improved Virginia". These 20 submarines (10 Block V, 5 Block VI, 5 Block VII) would carry VPM bringing the total number of Virginia-class submarines to 48 (including the 28 submarines in Blocks I, II, III and IV). The CBO in its 2012 report states that 33 Virginia-class submarines will be procured in the 2013–2032 timeframe, resulting in 49 submarines in total since 16 were already procured by the end of 2012. However, other sources believe that production will end with Block V. In addition, data provided in CBO reports tends to vary considerably compared to earlier editions.

Block VI submarines include an organic ability to employ seabed warfare equipment.

SSN(X)/Improved Virginia

Initially dubbed Future Attack Submarine and Improved Virginia class in early Congressional Budget Office (CBO) reports, the SSN(X) will instead be a largely new design that initially supplements and eventually replaces the Virginia class submarines.

In late 2014, the US Navy began early preparation work on the SSN(X). It was planned that the first submarine would be procured in 2025. However, their introduction (i.e., procurement of the first submarine) has been pushed back to 2033/2034. The long-range shipbuilding plan is for the new SSN to be authorized in 2034, and become operational by 2044 after the last Block VII Virginia is built. Roughly a decade would be spent identifying, designing, and demonstrating new technologies before an analysis of alternatives is issued in 2024. An initial small team has been formed to consult with industry and identify the threat environment and technologies the submarine will need to operate against in the 2050-plus timeframe.

In 2019, the Congressional Budget Office estimated that the SSN(X) boats could cost up to $5.5 billion per hull. The current Virginia-class boats cost about $2.8 billion per hull, while the Block V boats with the 80-foot Virginia Payload Module will cost about $3.2 billion. "The Navy indicates that the next-generation attack submarine should be faster, stealthier, and able to carry more torpedoes than the Virginia class, similar to the Seawolf-class submarine. CBO therefore assumed that the SSN(X) would be a Seawolf-sized SSN, which displaces about 9,100 tons when submerged, and would have an all-new design in keeping with the Navy's description of it as a fast, lethal next-generation attack submarine", the CBO wrote.

Potential exports 
On 16 September 2021, Australian Prime Minister Scott Morrison announced that Australia had canceled its contract with French shipbuilder Naval Group for 12  diesel-electric submarines based on the French  nuclear submarine that were to replace Australia's diesel-electric s. The AUKUS trilateral security pact between Australia, the United Kingdom (UK) and the United States, was announced the same day. Under the pact, the US will share nuclear propulsion technology with Australia the same as it has with the UK since 1958 as will the UK. The Royal Australian Navy (RAN) would acquire at least eight nuclear-powered submarines armed with conventional weapons to be built in Australia with basic design and key technologies decided by an 18-month research project. On 22 November 2021, Australia, UK and the US signed the Exchange of Naval Nuclear Propulsion Information Agreement (ENNPIA) treaty to share classified information about nuclear propulsion.

In March 2023, AUKUS announced that "in the early 2030s, pending Congressional approval, the United States intends to sell Australia three Virginia-class submarines, with the potential to sell up to two more if needed". These submarines will ensure there is no capability gap between when the Collins-class is retired and the introduction of a new class of nuclear-powered submarines SSN-AUKUS. AUKUS also announced on the same day, the UK's SSNR submarine design will be renamed SSN-AUKUS and be trilaterally-developed and built in the UK and in Australia. The SSN-AUKUS class "will have a high degree of commonality" with the Virginia-class, including "sharing elements of the propulsion plant, combat system and weapons".

The first Virginia-class boat is planned to be delivered to the RAN in 2033 and will be a boat that has been in service with the United States Navy. The second boat will be delivered in 2036 and the third boat in 2039. The first boat of the SSN-AUKUS class for the RAN is to be delivered in the early 2040s and by 2055 five boats are planned to have been built. If the SSN-AUKUS build schedule falls behind the RAN has the option of purchasing up to two additional Virginia-class boats.

See also
 List of submarine classes of the United States Navy
 List of submarines of the United States Navy
 List of submarine classes in service
 Submarines in the United States Navy
 Cruise missile submarine
 List of current United States Navy ships

References

Further reading
 
 
 
 
 
 
 
  Updates on the boats of the Virginia-class
  Q&A on the Virginia-class program since the Winter 2007 article

External links 

 Naval History & Heritage Command
 VIRGINIA CLASS ATTACK SUBMARINE - SSN
 Stealth, Endurance, and Agility Under the Sea
 Virginia Class Submarines Some U.S. Navy Photos of Virginia-class submarines
 Submarine Industrial Base Resources Information about the Submarine Industrial Base

Submarine classes
Naval ships of the United States
 
Submarines of the United States Navy
Submarines of the United States